Susanna-Assunta Sansone is a British-Italian data scientist who is professor of data readiness at the University of Oxford where she leads the data readiness group and serves as associate director of the Oxford e-Research Centre. Her research investigates techniques for improving the interoperability, reproducibility and integrity of data.

Early life and education 
Sansone is from Italy. She was an undergraduate student at the University of Naples Federico II. She earned her bachelor's degree in molecular biology and a PhD in microbiology at Imperial College London, where she worked in St Mary's Hospital, London. Her thesis investigated the role of the cofactored enzyme superoxide dismutase in the virulence of Salmonella.

Research and career 
After earning her doctorate, she moved to Microscience Ltd, where she characterised vaccine strains. In 2001, Sansone joined the European Bioinformatics Institute (EBI), part of the European Molecular Biology Laboratory (EMBL) where she worked in research data management. Sansone joined the University of Oxford in 2010. She became concerned that whilst there were vast amounts of data in the public domain, the majority of it was not reusable. To make data reusable, Sansone encourages researchers to combine their data with metadata: a description of what the data means. Sansone has described data reproducibility as “the foundation of every scientific field,”.

Sansone's research investigates strategies to enable the creation of research objects that are Findable, Accessible, Interoperable and Reusable (FAIR). She co-founded the peer-reviewed journal Scientific Data in 2013, and serves as chair of the Research Data Alliance. She co-authored the FAIR data principles in 2016, a set of guidelines for the scientific ecosystem. FAIR principles have since been adopted by funding bodies, scientific publishers and the private sector. Sansone works with partners to deliver data stewardship and data governance training and to develop guidelines to make data more accessible. She is one of the co-creators the FAIR Cookbook, an online resource for life scientists to enable them to keep FAIR data. Her research has been funded by the Biotechnology and Biological Sciences Research Council (BBSRC) and the European Union.

Selected publications 
Her publications include
 The FAIR Guiding Principles for scientific data management and stewardship
 ArrayExpress--a public database of microarray experiments and gene expression profiles
  The OBO Foundry: coordinated evolution of ontologies to support biomedical data integration
 The minimum information about a genome sequence (MIGS) specification
 MetaboLights—an open-access general-purpose repository for metabolomics studies and associated meta-data
 COVID-19 pandemic reveals the peril of ignoring metadata standards 
 ISA software suite: supporting standards-compliant experimental annotation and enabling curation at the community level
 Toward interoperable bioscience data
 Modeling biomedical experimental processes with OBI

References 

Living people
Italian emigrants to the United Kingdom
University of Naples Federico II alumni
Alumni of Imperial College London
Academics of the University of Oxford
Data scientists
21st-century British scientists
Year of birth missing (living people)